Fish soup is a food made by combining fish or seafood with vegetables and stock, juice, water, or another liquid. Hot soups are additionally characterized by boiling solid ingredients in liquids in a pot until the flavors are extracted, forming a broth.

Traditionally, soups are classified into two main groups: clear soups and thick soups. The established French classifications of clear soups are bouillon and consommé. Thick soups are classified depending upon the type of thickening agent used: bisques are made from puréed shellfish or vegetables thickened with cream; cream soups may be thickened with béchamel sauce; and veloutés are thickened with eggs, butter, and cream. Other ingredients commonly used to thicken soups and broths include rice, lentils, flour, and grains; many popular soups also include carrots and potatoes.

Fish soups are similar to fish stews, and in some cases there may not be a clear distinction between the two; however, fish soups generally have more liquid than stews.

Fish soups have been made since early times. Some soups are served with large chunks of fish or vegetables left in the liquid, while a broth is a flavored liquid usually derived from simmering a food or vegetable for a period of time in a stock. Bisques are heavy cream soups traditionally prepared with shellfish, but can be made with any type of seafood or puree of vegetables or fruits. Cream soups are flavored broths thickened with a white sauce. Although they may be consumed on their own, or with a meal, the canned, condensed form of cream soup is sometimes used as a quick sauce in a variety of meat and pasta convenience food dishes, such as casseroles. Similar to a bisque, chowders are thick soups usually containing seafood and potatoes, milk and cream.

List of fish soups

See also

 Fish stew
 List of fish and seafood soups
 List of soups

Notes

References
 Murdoch (2004) Essential Seafood Cookbook Soups and chowders, pp. 32–55. Murdoch Books. .
 Rumble, Victoria R (2009) Soup Through the Ages: A Culinary History With Period Recipes McFarland. .

External links
 Retro soups list

Fish dishes
Fish and seafood soups
World cuisine
Types of food
Fish soups